This is a list of banks in the United States affected by the 2007–2008 financial crisis. The list includes banks (including commercial banks, investment banks, and savings and loan associations) that have:
 been taken over or merged with another financial institution,
 been declared insolvent or liquidated, or
 filed for bankruptcy.
The Federal Deposit Insurance Corporation (FDIC) closed 465 failed banks from 2008 to 2012.

Banks 

The Federal Deposit Insurance Corporation (FDIC) may assume deposits of banks or allow other banks to assume them.  The largest banks to be acquired have been the Merrill Lynch acquisition by Bank of America, the Bear Stearns and Washington Mutual acquisitions by JPMorgan Chase, and the Countrywide Financial acquisition also by Bank of America. IndyMac Bank was also a large bank that was changed into a bridge bank by the FDIC, after its failure, until the funds can be disposed of. In addition, the investment bank Lehman Brothers filed for Chapter 11 bankruptcy protection in September 2008, citing bank debt of $613 billion and $155 billion in bond debt. The solvency of other U.S. banks was severely threatened, forcing the George W. Bush government to intervene with the $700 billion bailout plan of the Troubled Asset Relief Program.

As a result of the economic and financial crisis, over 65 U.S. banks have become insolvent and have been taken over by the FDIC since the beginning of 2008. Combined, these banks held over $55 billion in deposits, and the takeovers cost the federal government an estimated $17 billion.

A list of all banks that have failed since October 1, 2000, and either have been liquidated or are being liquidated by the FDIC is located at http://www.fdic.gov/bank/individual/failed/banklist.html.

2007 (3 total)

2008 (25 total)

2009 (140 total)

2010 (157 total)
The following 157 banks failed in 2010:

Credit unions 

The National Credit Union Administration (NCUA) does not have a table of failed credit unions prior to 2009. A list of credit unions which failed since 2009 can be found at https://ncua.gov/support-services/conservatorships-liquidations .  For failed credit unions prior to 2009 please refer to press releases regarding failed credit unions at https://ncua.gov/news/press-releases.

See also
 List of bank failures in the United States (2008–present)
 List of banks acquired or bankrupted during the Great Recession
National City acquisition by PNC
 March 2023 United States bank failures

General:
 Too big to fail
 List of largest U.S. bank failures

References

2007 in economics
2008 in economics
2009 in economics
Lists of banks in the United States
Great Recession in the United States
Bank failures in the United States
United States economic history-related lists